California Games II is a sports video game released by Epyx for MS-DOS in 1990. Versions were published for the Amiga, Atari ST, and Super Nintendo Entertainment System in 1992, then the Master System in 1993. This game is a sequel to California Games. An Atari Lynx version was announced and previewed in several magazines but was never released.

Gameplay
The included sports events are: 
Bodyboarding
Hang gliding
Jet surfing
Skateboarding
Snowboarding

The object of the game is to score as many points as possible by performing stunts and surviving the event. Each event has different play mechanics and physics as well.

References

External links

California Games II at Amiga Hall of Light

1990 video games
Cancelled Atari Lynx games
Epyx games
Imagineer games
Multiplayer and single-player video games
Multiple-sport video games
Super Nintendo Entertainment System games
Master System games
U.S. Gold games
Video games developed in the United States
Video games set in California
Water sports video games